Dmytro Krivtsov (born 3 April 1985) is a Ukrainian former professional road bicycle racer, who rode professionally between 2007 and 2016. He currently works as a directeur sportif for UCI Continental team .

Dmytro's older brother Yuriy Krivtsov was a part of the  squad. Krivtsov was part of the  team in the 2012 Tour de France, his Grand Tour début.

Major results

2006
 3rd Road race, National Under-23 Road Championships
2007
 3rd La Roue Tourangelle
 4th Mayor Cup
 7th Road race, UEC European Under-23 Road Championships
 10th Overall Ronde de l'Oise
2008
 Tour de Ribas
1st Stages 1 & 3
 3rd Overall Grand Prix of Donetsk
1st Stage 2
 3rd Overall Five Rings of Moscow
 4th Mayor Cup
 6th La Roue Tourangelle
 7th Memorial Oleg Dyachenko
2012
 2nd Road race, National Road Championships
2013
 8th Overall Tour of China II
 8th Central European Tour Košice–Miskolc
 8th Tour of Almaty
2014
 3rd Road race, National Road Championships
 5th Grand Prix of Moscow
 5th Race Horizon Park 3
 6th Memorial Oleg Dyachenko
 7th Mayor Cup
2015
 9th Krasnodar–Anapa
 9th Maykop–Ulyap–Maykop
 10th Overall Grand Prix of Adygeya
2016
 8th Minsk Cup
 10th Race Horizon Park Classic

References

External links
Lampre-ISD profile

1985 births
Living people
People from Pervomaisk, Mykolaiv Oblast
Ukrainian male cyclists
Cyclists at the 2012 Summer Olympics
Olympic cyclists of Ukraine
Sportspeople from Mykolaiv Oblast